Gliese 486, also known as Wolf 437, is a M-type main-sequence star in the constellation Virgo. Its surface temperature is 3340 K. Gliese 486 is similar to the Sun in its concentration of heavy elements, with a metallicity Fe/H index of 0.07. It was suspected to be a flare star, although measurements available in 2019 did not reveal any flares. The chemical makeup of the star is unremarkable and consistent with solar abundances or being slightly metal-poor.

The star has an unremarkable magnetic field in the chromosphere of about 1.6 kilogauss. It is rotating very slowly and is likely to be very old, belonging kinematically to the old thin disk of the Milky Way.

Multiplicity surveys did not detect any stellar companions to Gliese 486 as at 2020.

Planetary system

In 2021, one planet, named , was discovered on a tight, circular orbit. It represents a rare class of rocky exoplanet suitable for spectroscopic characterization in the near future by the James Webb Space Telescope. As in 2022, no hydrogen or steam dominated atmosphere was detected, although secondary planetary atmosphere with the higher molecular weight remains a possibility.

In August 2022, this planetary system was included among 20 systems to be named by the third NameExoWorlds project.

References

Virgo (constellation)
Planetary transit variables
M-type main-sequence stars
Planetary systems with one confirmed planet
J12475664+0945050
0486
062452
TIC objects
1827